The 1998 Scott Tournament of Hearts Canadian women's national curling championship, was played February 21 to March 1 at the Agridome in Regina, Saskatchewan. The home province of Saskatchewan would be represented by two teams, as the Sandra Schmirler rink was the defending champions team Canada. It would be the final Tournament of Hearts Sandra Schmirler would play in before her death in 2000.

The event set a record attendance of 154,688, which still holds today.

Teams

Standings

Results

Draw 1

Draw 2

Draw 3

Draw 4

Draw 5

Draw 6

Draw 7

Draw 8

Draw 9

Draw 10

Draw 11

Draw 12

Draw 13

Draw 14

Draw 15

Draw 16

Draw 17

Tiebreaker

Page playoffs

1 vs. 2

3 vs. 4

Semi-final

Final

References

Scotties Tournament of Hearts
Scott Tournament of Hearts
Scott Tournament Of Hearts, 1998
Sports competitions in Regina, Saskatchewan
Curling in Saskatchewan
1998 in women's curling
February 1998 sports events in Canada
March 1998 sports events in Canada